The Emerson Electric AN/APQ-153 was an I band radar system developed for the Northrop F-5E fighter aircraft. Required to fit into the tight confines of the originally radar-less F-5, the system offered relatively simple air-to-air modes and a short detection range. The AN/APQ-157 was a similar system with dual displays and controls for the twin-seat F-5F trainer. Many of the F-5s still flying have been upgraded to the improved AN/APQ-159.

The APQ-153 was a relatively simple Pulse-Doppler radar intended to improve gunnery on the F-5. It offered four modes of operation; AA1 and AA2 air-to-air target search at different ranges, "dogfight" which locked onto the closest target and offered ranging and gun cueing, and finally a missile bore-sight cueing mode that calculated the engagement envelope of the AIM-9 Sidewinder and gave the pilot directional cues to help them fly into the envelope.

The antenna was necessarily small, a  parabolic dish that was stabilized to account for maneuvering. This was connected to a small  B-Scope display in the cockpit.

External links
AN/APQ-153/-157 fire-control radars (United States)

Aircraft radars
Military radars of the United States
Radars of the United States Air Force
Emerson Electric radars